Robert Barclay (27 October 1906 – 13 July 1969) was an English footballer who played as an inside forward. Born in Scotswood, Newcastle upon Tyne Barclay is best remembered for his time at Sheffield United for whom he played in the 1936 FA Cup Final, but also had spells for Derby County and Huddersfield Town. Barclay also represented England on three occasions, scoring two goals.

Football career

Derby County
Barclay started his career with amateur clubs; Scotswood United Church, Bell's Close Amateurs, Allendale and finally Scotswood before signing for Derby County in 1928 where he became a protégé of George Jobey. He spent two seasons with The Rams scoring 23 league goals in 61 games.

Sheffield United
In 1931 Barclay signed for Sheffield United for £3,500. He was cool and methodical in his play, very clever, and was bought to lend inspiration to Jimmy Dunne in attack, although he also provided plenty of openings for the other attacking teammates (like inside-forward Jack Pickering). He remained a stalwart at Bramall Lane and was an important figure in the Blades FA Cup side of 1936, appearing in the final in which United lost 1–0 to Arsenal. Barclay scored 67 league goals for The Blades in 231 starts, although it has been said on numerous occasions that he given his apparent unselfishness in front of goal, he should have scored many more.

Huddersfield Town
In March 1937 Barclay was transferred to Huddersfield Town along with Eddie Boot for a combined fee of £7,000. He was a regular for Town in the following seasons and once again found himself on the losing side at Wembley as Huddersfield were beaten 1–0 by Preston North End in the 1938 FA Cup Final. With the outbreak of World War II the football league was suspended but Town retained Barclay's registration throughout. As was common in this period Barclay made wartime guest appearances for Barnsley, Bradford Park Avenue, Bradford City, York City, Crewe Alexandra, Oldham Athletic and back at his old club Sheffield United. With the war over Barclay was finally released by Huddersfield in 1946 having scored 19 goals from 74 league appearances.

International career
Barclay's good form with Sheffield United meant it was no surprise when he was handed his first of 3 England international caps in 1932. He made his debut against Scotland on 9 April 1932 in a Home Championship aged 25 years. Scoring on his debut Barclay found the net again in England's next game later the same year; another Home Championship fixture, this time against Ireland. Despite this promising start he was overlooked until 1936 when he won his third and final cap in another Home Championship game against Scotland.

International goals

Honours

FA Cup Runner up
Sheffield United: 1936
Huddersfield Town: 1938

Later career
Following his release by Huddersfield, Barclay played for Hurst in the Cheshire League before returning to Huddersfield Town to act as assistant trainer. He subsequently had a spell as a coach in the Netherlands.

References

Bibliography
A to Z Encyclopedia. Sheffield United matchday programme. 22 March 1986.
Young, Percy A. (1962). Football in Sheffield. 
Clarebrough, Denis. (1989) Sheffield United F.C., The First 100 years. 
Clarebrough, Denis. From The Past, Sheffield United matchday programme, 26 December 1986.

1906 births
1969 deaths
Footballers from Newcastle upon Tyne
English footballers
England international footballers
Association football forwards
English Football League players
Derby County F.C. players
Sheffield United F.C. players
Huddersfield Town A.F.C. players
Barnsley F.C. wartime guest players
Bradford City A.F.C. wartime guest players
Bradford (Park Avenue) A.F.C. wartime guest players
Crewe Alexandra F.C. wartime guest players
Oldham Athletic A.F.C. wartime guest players
York City F.C. wartime guest players
Ashton United F.C. players
FA Cup Final players